Attorney General Lawson may refer to:

George Leake (1856–1902), Attorney-General of Western Australia
George Walpole Leake (1825–1895), Attorney-General of Western Australia